The 2016 Maryland Terrapins football team represented the University of Maryland, College Park in the 2016 NCAA Division I FBS football season. It was the Terrapins' third season as a member of the Big Ten Conference, and a member of the East Division.  Maryland played its home games at Maryland Stadium in College Park, Maryland. It was their first year under new head coach D. J. Durkin. They finished the season 6–7, 3–6 in Big Ten play to finish in fifth place in the East Division. They were invited to the Quick Lane Bowl where they were defeated by Boston College.

Previous season
They finished the season 3–9, 1–7 in Big Ten play to finish in last place in the East Division.

Schedule
Maryland announced its 2016 football schedule on July 11, 2013. The 2016 schedule consists of 7 home and 5 away games in the regular season. The Terrapins will host Big Ten foes Michigan State, Minnesota, Ohio State, Purdue, and Rutgers, and will travel to Indiana, Michigan, Nebraska, and Penn State.

The team will play three non–conference games, one home game against Howard Bison from the Mid-Eastern Athletic Conference, and two road games which are against the Central Florida Knights (UCF) from the American Athletic Conference and the Florida International Panthers (FIU) from Conference USA.

Schedule Source:

Game summaries

Howard

at FIU

at UCF

Purdue

at Penn State

Minnesota

Michigan State

at Indiana

at Michigan

Ohio State

at Nebraska

Rutgers

Boston College–Quick Lane Bowl

Roster

Awards and honors

Weekly

All-Conference

References

Maryland
Maryland Terrapins football seasons
Maryland Terrapins football